Alessandro De Taddei (born 25 October 1971) is a former Italian speed skater. He competed at the 1992 Winter Olympics and the 1994 Winter Olympics.

References

External links
 

1971 births
Living people
Italian male speed skaters
Olympic speed skaters of Italy
Speed skaters at the 1992 Winter Olympics
Speed skaters at the 1994 Winter Olympics
Sportspeople from the Province of Verona